WJPT (106.3 FM) is a commercial radio station licensed to Fort Myers, Florida.  It airs a soft adult contemporary format, switching to Christmas music for much of November and December.  WJPT is owned by the Beasley Broadcast Group, Inc., and uses the branding "Southwest Florida's Soft Hits."  It carries two weekday nationally syndicated music shows, "Delilah" which features call-ins and requests, and "Intelligence for Your Life with John Tesh" which includes tips on living a better life.

Studios and offices are on South Tamiami Trail in Estero.  The transmitter is off Safety Lane in Fort Myers Beach, Florida.  WJPT broadcasts using HD Radio technology.  Its HD-2 digital subchannel plays oldies music.

History
On , the station first signed on as WSUV.  The original city of license was Fort Myers Villas and the studios were on Colonial Boulevard.  The owner was Jerry Bellairs and his wife Vivian served as vice president of operations.  The station had an adult contemporary format.  In 1994, the call sign switched to WROC-FM with an album rock format.  That only lasted a year.

The station was sold for $950,000 in 1994 and the following year, it changed its call letters to WJST.  It aired a mix of adult standards and soft oldies for Southwest Florida's large retired community.   

In 1997, the station was bought by Beasley Broadcasting for $5 million.  Beasley updated the playlist to Soft AC.  In 2000, it made a slight change in its call sign, becoming WJPT.

On September 25, 2008, the station changed its moniker to "Sunny 106.3". WJPT now covers an area of Southwest Florida between Naples and Punta Gorda, and reaching into the Everglades.

Old logo

References

External links

JPT
Mass media in Fort Myers, Florida
Beasley Broadcast Group radio stations
Soft adult contemporary radio stations in the United States
1991 establishments in Florida
Radio stations established in 1991